Lyutayevo is a rural locality (a selo) and the administrative center of Lyutayevsky Selsoviet, Soloneshensky District, Altai Krai, Russia. The population was 310 as of 2013. There are 8 streets.

Geography 
Lyutayevo is located 36 km north of Soloneshnoye (the district's administrative centre) by road.

References 

Rural localities in Soloneshensky District